Sir Basil Hamilton Hebden Neven-Spence (12 June 1888 – 13 September 1974) was a Scottish Unionist Party politician and military physician.

Neven-Spence came from a prominent landowning family in the Shetland Islands. Neven-Spence graduated from Edinburgh University in 1911. He served with the Royal Army Medical Corps, seconded to help the Egyptian Army and government of Sudan, and in the First World War, mainly in the Middle East. He received the Order of the Nile for his role in the Darfur Expedition. Following the war he organised a campaign to treat sleeping sickness in Darfur. He returned to the University of Edinburgh to study for an M.D., before moving to Aldershot in 1924 to work as a specialist physician to the British Army. He retired from the Army in 1927 with the rank of Major.

Neven-Spence's family had owned property in Shetland for several generations and he became Vice-Convenor of Zetland County Council.

Neven-Spence first contested the Orkney and Shetland constituency in 1929. He did not contest the seat in 1931, but was elected in 1935 and served as the Member of Parliament until he lost his seat at the 1950 general election to Jo Grimond of the Liberal Party. He was knighted in 1945 and served as Lord Lieutenant of Shetland from 1952 to 1963.  As of 2022, Neven-Spence is the most recent MP for the Orkney and Shetland constituency to not be from either the Liberal Party or the Liberal Democrats. He once lived on the island of Uyea.

Family
Basil St. Clair Neven-Spence, Sir Basil's son, served in the Colonial Office following serving in World War II. Basil St. Clair committed suicide at the age of 22, after having been assigned to the island of Tanna in the New Hebrides.

References

External links 

1888 births
1974 deaths
Unionist Party (Scotland) councillors
Lord-Lieutenants of Shetland
Knights Bachelor
20th-century Scottish medical doctors
Royal Army Medical Corps officers
Unionist Party (Scotland) MPs
Alumni of the University of Edinburgh
UK MPs 1935–1945
UK MPs 1945–1950
British Army personnel of World War I
Place of birth missing
Members of the Parliament of the United Kingdom for Orkney and Shetland
Councillors in Shetland